Pierre Amédée Emilien Probe Jaubert (3 June 1779 – 28 January 1847) was a French diplomat, academic, orientalist, translator, politician, and traveler. He was Napoleon's "favourite orientalist adviser and dragoman".

Biography
Born in Aix-en-Provence, Jaubert was one of the most distinguished pupils of Silvestre de Sacy, whose funeral Discours he gave in 1838. Jaubert acted as interpreter to Napoleon Bonaparte during the Egyptian Campaign of 1798–1799, in which he was a member of the Egyptian Institute of Sciences and Arts.

On his return to Paris he held various posts in the government. In 1802 he accompanied Horace Sébastiani de La Porta on his Eastern mission, and in 1804 he was present in the Ottoman Empire, assisting Sébastiani in Istanbul.

In 1805, he was dispatched to Qajar Persia in the "Jaubert Mission", to arrange an alliance with Shah Fat′h Ali, but on the way there he was seized and imprisoned in a dry cistern for four months by the Pasha of Doğubeyazıt. Jaubert was allowed to go after the pasha died; he successfully accomplished his mission, and rejoined Napoleon in the Duchy of Warsaw (1807). Amédée Jaubert was at Finckenstein Palace for the negotiation of the Treaty of Finckenstein which formulised the Franco-Persian alliance on 27 April 1807. In 1809 he became correspondent of the Royal Institute of the Netherlands.

On the eve of Napoleon's downfall, he was appointed chargé d'affaires at Constantinople.

The Bourbon Restoration ended his diplomatic career, but in 1818 he undertook a journey with government aid to Tibet, from whence he succeeded in introducing into France 400 Kashmir goats. Jaubert spent the rest of his life in study, in writing and in teaching. He became professor of Persian in the Collège de France, and director of the École des langues orientales, and in 1830 was elected member of the Académie des Inscriptions. In 1841 he was made a Peer of France and member of the Conseil d'État. He died in Paris.

Besides articles in the Journal asiatique, he published Voyage en Arménie et en Perse (1821; the edition of 1860 has a notice of Jaubert, by M. Sdillot) and Elements de la grammaire turque (1823–1834).

See also
 Franco-Persian alliance

Notes

References
 In turn, it cites as references:
notices in the Journal Asiatique, January 1847
Journal des Débats, 30 January 1847

People from Aix-en-Provence
1779 births
1847 deaths
19th-century French diplomats
French orientalists
French people of the Napoleonic Wars
French translators
French travel writers
History of Tibet
Qajar Iran
French expatriates in Iran
Spies of the French Revolutionary and Napoleonic Wars
Academic staff of the Collège de France
Commission des Sciences et des Arts members
Members of the Académie des Inscriptions et Belles-Lettres
Members of the Royal Netherlands Academy of Arts and Sciences
Members of the Société Asiatique
Peers of France
Burials at Père Lachaise Cemetery
Dragomans